Joanne Henke (born 5 November 1958) is a former Australian alpine skier who represented Australia at the 1976 Winter Olympics. She is the daughter of former ice hockey player and Australian winter sports administrator Geoff Henke and 1952 figure skating Olympian Gweneth Molony.

Notes

References 
 
 

Living people
1958 births
Olympic alpine skiers of Australia
Alpine skiers at the 1976 Winter Olympics
Australian female alpine skiers
20th-century Australian women